Charles Stein may refer to:

Charles Stein (athlete) (1911-1981), Luxembourgian Olympic runner
Charles Stein (statistician) (1920-2016), American statistician
Charles F. Stein (1900–1979), Baltimore historian and heraldist
Charles Francis Stein, Sr. (1866–1939), Baltimore city judge
Charles Ramsay Stirling Stein (1897–?), Canadian Army officer
Charles-Adolphe Stein (1878–1938), Quebec politician, lawyer and judge